Richard Rowell is a former ice hockey forward who played for Colorado College in the 1940s.

Career
Rowell began attending Colorado College in 1941, appearing briefly for the ice hockey team. The program was suspended after the United States entered World War II. Rowell was back with the program beginning in 1946 and he helped the Tigers rise to the top of the college hockey landscape. In his junior and senior season Rowell led his team in scoring and ended his career as the program's all-time leading scorer. He retained that distinction for only one season.

Statistics

Regular season and playoffs

Awards and honors

References

External links
 

Date of birth unknown
Canadian ice hockey forwards
Colorado College Tigers men's ice hockey players
Ice hockey people from Winnipeg
AHCA Division I men's ice hockey All-Americans